The Northamptonshire Women's cricket team is the women's representative cricket team for the English historic county of Northamptonshire. They play their home games at various grounds across the county, including Dolben Cricket Ground, Finedon and Northampton Road, Brixworth. They are captained by Patricia Hankins. In 2019, they played in Division Three of the final season of the Women's County Championship, and have since competed in the Women's Twenty20 Cup. They are partnered with the regional side Sunrisers.

History
Northamptonshire Women joined the national women's cricket structure in 2001, playing in the Emerging Counties competition: prior to this, they had only played one-off games, combined with other county sides. They were promoted from the Emerging Counties league in 2002, and after this moved between Division Three of the Women's County Championship, and the County Challenge Cup, the tier below the Championship. In 2008, Northamptonshire were promoted from Division 5 Midlands, after which they were a consistent Division 4 and Division 3 side. In 2009, they also joined the Women's Twenty20 Cup for its inaugural season, and consistently competed in the lower tiers of the competition.

2017 was Northamptonshire's most successful year, seeing them promoted in both the Championship and the T20 Cup, from Division 3 to Division 2. They lost only one game all season across both competitions, and were promoted in the Championship by beating Durham in a play-off by 5 wickets. Northamptonshire batter Alicia Presland was the 7th highest run-scorer across the Twenty20 Cup, with 224 runs.

Northamptonshire were relegated in both competitions the following season, 2018, however. In 2019, they bounced back, again topping their division in both competitions.  However, due to a restructure of women's cricket, there was no promotion in 2019, with the County Championship being discontinued and the 2021 Women's Twenty20 Cup being regionalised. In 2021, they competed in the East Midlands Group of the Twenty20 Cup, but finished bottom with one victory. In 2022, they finished top of Group 5 of the 2022 Women's Twenty20 Cup, but lost in the final to Leicestershire. They also joined the East of England Women's County Championship in 2022, finishing fourth out of seven in their first season.

Players

Current squad
Based on appearances in the 2022 season.

Notable players
Players who have played for Northamptonshire and played internationally are listed below, in order of first international appearance (given in brackets):

 Ciara Metcalfe (1999)
 Zehmarad Afzal (2000)
 Emma Campbell (2010)
 Jasmine Titmuss (2019)

Seasons

Women's County Championship

Women's Twenty20 Cup

See also
 Northamptonshire County Cricket Club
 Sunrisers (women's cricket)

References

Cricket in Northamptonshire
Women's cricket teams in England